The San Diego Aqueduct, or San Diego Project, is a system of four aqueducts in the U.S. state of California, supplying about 70 percent of the water supply for the city of San Diego. The system comprises the First and Second San Diego Aqueducts, carrying water from the Colorado River west to reservoirs on the outskirts of San Diego. Pipelines 3 and 4 make up the  Second Aqueduct. The smaller,  Fallbrook-Ocean Branch branches from the First Aqueduct into Murray Reservoir. The La Mesa-Sweetwater Branch originates from the First Aqueduct, flowing into the Sweetwater Reservoir.

Construction
The First Aqueduct was designed by the Bureau of Reclamation and constructed from 1945 to 1947 by the Navy Department. Pipeline 2, of the First Aqueduct, was built by the Bureau of Reclamation from 1952 and 1957, roughly paralleling Pipeline 1. In 1957, the construction of Pipeline 3 of the Second Aqueduct was begun by the Metropolitan Water District (MWD), completing it in May 1960. In 1968, the construction of Pipeline 4, of the Second Aqueduct, began. Pipeline 4 was completed in 1971. Construction on the project was completed in 2010.

First Aqueduct

Second Aqueduct

The remaining  consist of pre-stressed  diameter concrete pipe and steel pipe.

References

External links
 Metropolitan Water District of Southern California official website
 Aquafornia California Water News Blog

Aqueducts in California
Transportation buildings and structures in Riverside County, California
Transportation buildings and structures in San Diego County, California
Colorado River